Klekotna  ( or Charlotte's Vale) is a village in the administrative district of Gmina Dobrodzień, within Olesno County, Opole Voivodeship, in south-western Poland.

The village is officially bilingual in both Polish and German. There is a large German minority here; the area, being in Silesia, used to be part of Germany until 1945.

References

Klekotna